Labyrint formed in 2007 was a Swedish hip hop music group from Gottsunda, Uppsala.

After performing for a number of years together, in 2007, they had a breakthrough with "Vår Betong" and in 2009 collaborated with Masse from The Salazar Brothers to release a mixtape that became popular through downloads on Whoa.se website. Based on these successes, Universal Records expressed interest signing them to the label in 2011. However their launch was marred by Växjö cancelling their show after advice from the security authorities about the controversial use of cannabis during their gigs. This turned into a public debate in the media about drugs in hip hop culture. Labyrint's debut studio album on the label was Labababa that was released on 30 November 2011 in the wake of the controversy. It included collaborations with Kapten Röd and Gregor.

The band is best known for the 2012 "Broder del 2" a rap anthem that included Labyrint with great number of rap and urban acts like Briz, Ras Daniel, Rootbound Williams, Kapten Röd, Essa Cham, Syster Sol, Slag Från Hjärtat, Donny Dread, Amsie Brown, General Knas, Dani M & Chords.

In 2014, Labyrint released their second studio album on Universal titled Garalaowit becoming their biggest selling release.

Members
The band is multiethnic and it is made up of:
Aki (Aleksi Swallow) – rapper / songwriter. He is of Finnish descent on the maternal side and Chilean descent on the paternal side.
Jacco (Jacques Mattar) – rapper / songwriter. He is of Palestinian descent.
Dajanko (Dejan Milacic) – rapper / songwriter. He is of Serbian descent.
Sai (Simon Wimmerberg) – DJ / producer. He is of Finnish descent on his maternal side.

Discography

Albums

EPS

Singles
as Labyrint

Notes

Solo projects

Aki
The band member and rapper Aki (Aleksi Swallow) of the band Labyrint has also done a solo collaboration with Kapten Röd resulting in a Number 1 hit for him in "När solen går ner".

References

Swedish hip hop groups
Swedish-language singers
Musical groups from Uppsala